Rémi Depalmas (born 11 July 1988) is a French professional football player who currently plays as a winger for Hong Kong Premier League club HKFC.

References

External links
 Rémi Depalmas at HKFA
 

Living people
1988 births
French footballers
Association football midfielders
Hong Kong Premier League players
Hong Kong FC players
Expatriate footballers in Hong Kong